George Gustav Adomeit (15 January 1879 – 1967) was a Prussian-American painter and printmaker, and also co-founder and long-time president of the Caxton Company, a printing company that was bought by the Fetter Printing Company in 1955.

Biography 
Adomeit was born in Memel, Germany (now Klaipėda, Lithuania), but at the age of four he moved with his family to Cleveland, Ohio, which became his home and which was where he died in 1967.

Heavily involved in the Cleveland art community, he was a member of the Cleveland Society of Artists. His paintings include Down to the Harbor (1925).

His daughter was the book collector Ruth E. Adomeit.

Notable collections

Cleveland Museum of Art, Cleveland, Ohio

References

External links
Ruth E. Adomeit papers, 1907-1958; Adomeit's daughter donated her papers in 1978 to the Smithsonian Archives of American Art
 Biography on the Cleveland Museum of Art website, taken from Robinson and Steinberg, "Transformations in Cleveland Art" (CMA, 1996), p. 221
 Biography at Art of the Print
First Snow by George Adomeit at Cleveland Public Library

1879 births
1967 deaths
People from Klaipėda
19th-century American painters
American male painters
20th-century American painters
German emigrants to the United States
People from East Prussia
Cleveland School (arts community)
20th-century American printmakers
19th-century American male artists
20th-century American male artists